The Gerald Loeb Award is given annually for multiple categories of business reporting. The "Radio" category was awarded in 1997 and 1999–2001.

Gerald Loeb Award for Radio (1997, 1999–2001)

 1997: Sarah Gardner, Marketplace-USC radio

Story:
"Bottom Line Blues"

 1999:  by Karen Tofte and team, Minnesota Public Radio

Story:
"The World Turned Upside Down", March 18, 1998

 2000: "Minnesota in the Dot Com Age" by Carl Goldstein and team, Minnesota Public Radio
 2001: "The 100 Greatest Events in the History of the Automotive Industry" by Ed Wallace, KLIF-AM

References

External links
 Gerald Loeb Award historical winners list

 
American journalism awards
Gerald Loeb Award winners